Dream is the seventh studio album by the American singer Angie Stone. It was released on November 6, 2015, by Shanachie Records in collaboration with Conjunction Entertainment and TopNotch Music. Following short stints with Stax Records and Saguaro Road Records, Stone signed with Shanachie Records Entertainment through a partnership with frequent collaborator Walter Millsap III. Millsap and Stone co-wrote the majority of the album with a core group that included former The Clutch members Candice Nelson and Balewa Muhammad as well as the producers Teak Underdue and The Heavyweights.

Release and promotion 
On May 8, 2015, thevpromotional single "Dream" was released to iTunes Store. The song was used in the TV1 television film Love of Ruth. Later in August, Stone confirmed that her seventh studio album would be released on November. On October 3, the album was made available for pre-order on the iTunes Store with the promotional single "Magnet" open for downloading.

Singles 
"2 Bad Habits" was the first single released from the album, on September 11, 2015. Its accompanying music video was released on October 6, 2015. The song peaked at number 18 on Billboards Adult R&B Songs chart.

On December 5, 2015, Stone revealed on her official Facebook page that a second single would be chosen by fans through a seven-day poll on Singersroom. The options for the second single were "Dream", "Magnet" and "Dollar Bill".

Critical reception 

Dream received generally positive reviews from music critics. The AllMusic, editor Andy Kellman, found that "while it doesn't sound as big-budgeted as her earlier releases, Dream is very much in line with Stone's discography, neither straight retro-soul nor pop-oriented contemporary R&B, though it does lean closer to the former." He called the album "a concise album where the singer covers a lot of ground, batting her eyelashes, declaring devotion, seeking affirmation, repairing a relationship, and scolding an immature lover".

Matt Bauer of Exclaim! gave the album an 8/10 reating and wrote that its themes of personal and romantic renewal as well as tackling the rocky terrain of failed relationships never seem redundant over the listen, calling the record "another solid and empowering effort". In his review for Music Connection, Jonathan Widran found that with Dream Stone "lays a powerful, emotional and spiritual foundation even when she’s floating dreamily in atmospheric old-school soul textures. Deftly balancing the passion with the pain, she artfully—and with sensuality to spare—traverses the classic sounds she emerged with in the late ‘70s and created for D’Angelo in the ‘90s with more contemporary driving beats. Stone gives R&B fans of all generations something to dream on."

Commercial performance 
The album debuted at number 59 on the US Billboard 200 and number three on the Top R&B/Hip-Hop Albums chart, with approximately 9,000 copies sold in the week ending November 12, 2015, according to Nielsen Music. This marked Stone's highest debut on both charts since her fourth album, The Art of Love & War (2007).

Track listing

Personnel
Credits adapted from the liner notes of Dream.

 Charles Amos – assistant
 Bobby & The Heavyweights – arranger, engineer, producer, vocal producer
 John Cranfield – assistant
 Toby Davis – keyboards
 Sheldon Ellerby – engineer, producer
 Xavier Gordon – instrumentation, producer
 John Greenham – mastering
 Lavi Hendin – art direction
 Dave Hollister – vocals
 Breyona Holt – photography
 Dae Howerton – photo editing
 Adam Johnson – bass
 Jamie Jones – instrumentation
 David Lopez – mixing
 Perry Mapp – assistant
 Alec Jace Millsap – assistant
 Walter Millsap III – engineer, executive producer, producer
 Walter Millsap IV – assistant, executive producer
 Peter Mokran – mixing
 Monte Neuble – instrumentation, producer
 Balewa Muhammad – assistant, engineer, executive producer, producer
 Candice Nelson – executive producer, coordinator, backing vocalist 
 Jason Pennock – instrumentation, producer
 Brian Peters – executive producer, project coordinator
 Jim Reid – horn
 David Rideau – mixing
 Tim Stewart – guitar, instrumentation, producer
 Angie Stone – executive producer, vocals
 Teak Underdue – executive producer, instrumentation, producer
 Rick Watford – guitar

Charts

References

2015 albums
Angie Stone albums
Shanachie Records albums